Pingchang or Ping Chang may refer to:

Places
 Pingchang County, Bazhong Prefecture, Sichuan Province, China
 Pingchang Town, Pingqiao District, Xinyang Prefecture, Henan Province, China; see List of township-level divisions of Henan
 Pingchang Commandery, Dingyang, Jin Dynasty; former name of Jiexiu, Jinzhong, Shanxi, China; see Jiexiu
 Pingchang Village, Beitun District, Taichung, Taiwan; see Beitun District
 Pingchang Station, a rail station on Line 6 (Chongqing Rail Transit)

People
 Chang Ping (Chang Ping), given name "Ping", surname "Chang", so in Western name order is "Ping Chang"
 Empress Liu (Zhezong), with the title "Lady of Pingchang Commandery"
 Qifu Chipan, Duke of Pingchang, a prince of the Xianbei state Western Qin
 Princess of Pingchang, sister of Prince Regnant Anshiba of Western Qin, Qifu Mumo
 Princess of Pingchang, daughter of Emperor Xuanzong of Tang
 Prince of Pingchang, Fu Qing (died 355); failed usurper to his cousin, the Emperor Changsheng of Former Qin, Fu Sheng, and his uncle, the Emperor Jingming of Former Qin, Fu Jian (317–355)
 Earl of Pingchang, Meng Renzhi, son of Emperor Gaozu of Later Shu, Meng Zhixiang

See also
 Ping (disambiguation)
 Chang (disambiguation)
 Pyeongchang (disambiguation)
 Changping (disambiguation)